JZ, J/Z, or J-Z may refer to:

People:
Jay-Z (born 1969), American rapper and business executive
John Zachary Young (1907–1997), English zoologist
J. Z. Knight (born 1946), American psychic
Gesias Calvancanti (born 1983), Brazilian mixed martial artist
Jacob Zuma (born 1942), South African politician

Other uses:
JZ (x86 instruction) ("jump on zero"), an Intel x86 assembly language instruction
J/Z (New York City Subway service)
Toyota JZ engine, a straight-6 automobile engine
Jugoslovenske Železnice, the Yugoslavian state railway 
Skyways (airline) (IATA code: JZ)
JuristenZeitung, common abbreviation of the German law journal